Amparo, a Portuguese and Spanish word meaning refuge, shelter, or protection, may refer to:

People
Amparo (name)
Amparo people, Afro-Cuban descendants of Angola

Places

Brazil
Amparo, São Paulo
Amparo, Paraíba
Amparo do Serra, Minas Gerais
Amparo de São Francisco, Sergipe
Santo Antônio do Amparo, Minas Gerais

Other places
Amparo Museum, Puebla, Mexico
Amparo High School, Caloocan, Philippines

Other uses
Amparo (film), a 2022 Colombian drama film
Massacre of El Amparo, the killing of 14 fishermen in El Amparo, Venezuela in 1988
Megachile amparo, a bee of family Megachilidae
Recurso de amparo or writ of amparo, a form of constitutional relief found in the legal systems of some countries
Roman Catholic Diocese of Amparo, in Amparo, São Paulo